Knight Willem Eggert, (Amsterdam, 1360 - Purmerend, 15 July 1417) was a Dutch politician (stadtholder of Holland), noble, banker and schepen of Amsterdam. He owned much land in Weesp, Monnickendam, Oosthuizen, Aalsmeer and Wognum.

Biography 
Eggert was the son of the rich landholder Jan Eggert and member of the Eggert family. In 1392 he became advisor to Albert I, Duke of Bavaria, count of Holland. In 1404 he was made treasurer of Amsterdam. Eggert was the financier to the count, one of his main advisers in the financial field, and a powerful member in Holland. In 1410 Eggert was styled 1st Lord of the free and high fief Purmerend and Purmerland. In the same year he was allowed, by count William VI of Holland, to build his own fortified castle, Slot Purmerstein. Constructions on the castle finished in 1413. He played an important role during the reign of William VI, including in the conclusion of a three-year peace with the Frisians in 1414. Between 1416 and 1417 Eggert was named a stadtholder of Holland.

Willem Eggert married to Nelle Heynenzoonsdr Vechter and together they had four children: His son Jan Eggert succeeded his father as Lord of Purmerend and Purmerland. His daughters: Jennette Eggert married Reinout van Brakel originally from Geldern, who was appointed Baljuw of Amstelland, Aleid Eggert married to Gerrit van Zijl from Utrecht, and Lijsbeth Willemsdr (also named Imme) Eggert married Willem de Grebber.

References

External links 
 Willem Eggert at dutch DBNL
 Het Hollandse Kastelenteam - Kasteel Purmerstein
 Kastelen in Nederland - Purmerstein

Medieval Dutch nobility
Lords of Purmerend
Lords of Purmerland and Ilpendam
Dutch stadtholders
Politicians from Amsterdam
1360 births
1417 deaths
14th-century people of the Holy Roman Empire